The Desiya Forward Bloc is a political party in the India state of Tamil Nadu. Arasakumar B T is the founder president of the party, whilst S.R. Thevar is its Tamil Nadu state unit president. The party has its headquarters in Chennai.

The party fielded four candidates in the 2014 Indian general election, whom together mustered 17,474 votes.

References

Political parties in Tamil Nadu
Political parties with year of establishment missing